China Media Group may refer to:

China Media Group, the predominant state radio and television broadcaster in the PRC
China Media Group Co., Ltd., a publicly listed Chinese holding company in the media sector